Lauterborn is a quarter (Stadtteil) of Offenbach am Main, Germany, with approximately 9,500 inhabitants (2020). It is located in the south-east part of the town and borders Frankfurt and the municipal forest.

History
Lauterborn was the historic name of a fountain. The district was built from the 1960s on with terraced houses and apartment blocks. A half dozen atrium houses were constructed by the famous architect Egon Eiermann. The central park is called "John-F.-Kennedy-Promenade".

Until the 1990s there were some smaller factories and a truck garage of the US Army next to Lauterborn. These facilities closed and offices and the distribution center Briefzentrum 63 of the Deutsche Post were built. 
Honda Europa (North) has its headquarters in Lauterborn. In 1999 opened the shopping mall "Ring-Center".

Gallery
Impressions of Lauterborn

References

External links 
   
 Website Offenbach am Main

Lauterborn